NA-40 North Waziristan is a constituency for the National Assembly of Pakistan comprising North Waziristan.

Members of Parliament

2002–2018: NA-40 Tribal Area-V

2018-2022: NA-48 Tribal Area-IX

Election 2002 

General elections were held on 10 Oct 2002. Molvi Nek Zaman an Independent candidate won by 14,773 votes.

Election 2008 

The result of general election 2008 in this constituency is given below.

Result 
Muhammad Kamran Khan succeeded in the election 2008 and became the member of National Assembly.

Election 2013 

General elections were held on 11 May 2013. Muhammad Nazir Khan an Independent candidate won  by 18,055 votes and became the  member of National Assembly.

Election 2018

General elections were held on 25 July 2018.

See also
NA-39 Bannu
NA-41 Lakki Marwat

References

External links 
 Election result's official website

48
48